The 2013 PGA Tour of Australasia was a series of men's professional golf events played mainly in Australia. The main tournaments on the PGA Tour of Australasia were played in the southern summer so they were split between the first and last months of the year.

Schedule
The following table lists official events during the 2013 season.

Unofficial events
The following events were sanctioned by the PGA Tour of Australasia, but did not carry official money, nor were wins official.

Order of Merit
The Order of Merit was based on prize money won during the season, calculated in Australian dollars.

Notes

References

External links

PGA Tour of Australasia
Australasia
PGA Tour of Australasia
PGA Tour of Australasia